King of Boys is a 2018 Nigerian crime political thriller film written, co-produced and directed by Kemi Adetiba. It is the second movie directed by Kemi Adetiba following the release of The Wedding Party. It reunites Kemi Adetiba with Adesua Etomi and Sola Sobowale, after they worked together in her directorial debut, The Wedding Party. The movie is focused on power tussle and stars rappers Illbliss and Reminisce in their movie debut roles. Other casts member include Paul Sambo, Osas Ajibade Ighodaro, Toni Tones, Sani Muazu, Demola Adedoyin and Akin Lewis.

Plot 
King of Boys tells the story of Alhaja Eniola Salami (played by Sola Sobowale), a businesswoman and philanthropist with a promising political future. She is drawn into a struggle for power, which in turn threatens everything around her as a result of her growing political ambitions. To come out of this on top, she is caught up in a game of trust, not knowing whom she really has to look up to, and this leads to her ruthlessness.

Cast 
Sola Sobowale as Alhaja Eniola Salami
Adesua Etomi as Kemi Salami
Jide Kosoko as Alhaji Salami
Osas Ighodaro as Sade Bello
Illbliss as Odogwu Malay
Reminisce as Makanaki
Toni Tones as Young Salami
Akin Lewis as Aare Akinwade
Demola Adedoyin as Kitan Salami
Sani Mu'azu as Inspector Shehu
Paul Sambo as Nurudeen Gobir
Sharon Ooja as Amaka
Jumoke George as Party Gossip 1
 Lanre Hassan as Iyaloja

Reception 
It was listed as one of the top 10 movies of 2018 by the News Agency of Nigeria (NAN)

Box Office 
King of Boys grossed ₦ 200 million after 7 weeks in cinemas and ₦245 million overall.

Sequel 
The sequel, The Return of the King was released on 27 August 2021 exclusively on Netflix as a 7-part limited series.

Awards and nominations

See also
 List of Nigerian films of 2018
 Africa Magic Viewers' Choice Awards

References

2018 films
Films directed by Kemi Adetiba
Yoruba-language films
English-language Nigerian films
2010s English-language films
Nigerian thriller films
2018 crime thriller films
Films set in Africa